Neope is a genus of butterflies of the family Nymphalidae found in Asia.

Species
Listed alphabetically:
 Neope agrestis (Oberthür, 1876) – (China)
 Neope armandii (Oberthür, 1876) – (Assam, Myanmar, northern Thailand, Vietnam, Yunnan, China)
 Neope bhadra (Moore, 1857) – (Sikkim, Upper Burma)
 Neope bremeri (C. & R. Felder, 1862) – (China)
 Neope chayuensis Huang, 2002
 Neope christi Oberthür, 1886 – (China)
 Neope dejeani Oberthür, 1894
 Neope goschkevitschii (Ménétriés, 1857)
 Neope lacticolora (Fruhstorfer, 1908) – (Taiwan)
 Neope muirheadii (C. & R. Felder, 1862) – (China, Burma, Indochina)
 Neope niphonica Butler, 1881 – (Japan)
 Neope oberthueri Leech, 1891 – (China)
 Neope pulaha (Moore, [1858]) – veined labyrinth (Bhutan, Sikkim, Assam, Burma, Nepal, southern Tibet, Yunnan, Taiwan)
 Neope pulahina (Evans, 1923) – scarce labyrinth (Bhutan, Sikkim, Assam, south-eastern Tibet (Metok))
 Neope pulahoides (Moore, [1892]) - (Assam, Myanmar, northern Thailand, Laos, northern Vietnam, China)
 Neope ramosa Leech, 1890 – (China)
 Neope serica (Leech, 1892) – (China)
 Neope simulans Leech, 1891 – (Tibet)
 Neope watanabei Matsumura, 1909 – (Taiwan)
 Neope yama (Moore, [1858]) – (Bhutan, northern India)

References

External links
Images representing Neope at Consortium for the Barcode of Life
Images representing Neope at Encyclopedia of Life

Satyrini
Butterflies of Indochina
Taxa named by Frederic Moore
Nymphalidae genera